Carinodrillia felis is an extinct species of sea snail, a marine gastropod mollusk in the family Pseudomelatomidae, the turrids and allies.

Distribution
This extinct species occurs in Pliocene strata and Miocene strata of Ecuador; age range: 5.332 to 3.6 Ma

References

 Olsson, Axel Adolf. Neogene mollusks from northwestern Ecuador. Paleontological research institution, 1964.

External links
 Worldwide Mollusc Species Data Base : Carinodrillia felis

felis
Gastropods described in 1964